The Venerable  Gary Lea Hastings  has been  Archdeacon of Tuam  since 2006.

Hastings was born in 1956, educated at the New University of Ulster and ordained in 1990. After a curacy in Galway he was the Incumbent of the Aughaval group from 1995 to 2012; and, during the same period, was also Domestic Chaplain to the Bishop of Tuam. He became a Canon of St Mary's Cathedral, Tuam in 2000; and, in 2010, of St Patrick's Cathedral, Dublin. He was Rector of Galway from 2009 to 2018. He was appointed to the parish of Holy Trinity, Killiney, Co. Dublin in 2018.

Notes

1956 births
Irish Anglicans
Archdeacons of Tuam
Alumni of Ulster University
Living people